George B. Delahunty (born May 5, 1952) is an American physiologist and endocrinologist. He was a long-time professor at Goucher College, working there from 1979 to 2018. Delahunty was the Lilian Welsh Professor of Biology and a co-founder of the post-baccalaureate premedical program at Goucher College. His research explored metabolism and endocrine control in vertebrates.

Early life and education 
Delahunty was born in Upper Darby, Pennsylvania. He earned a Bachelor of Science from Duquesne University in 1974 and completed his doctorate in physiology and endocrinology at Marquette University in 1979. Under doctoral advisor , Delahunty completed his dissertation entitled Environmental Effects on the Metabolism of Carassius Auratus: Role of the Pineal Organ and Retinal Pathways. He received a fellowship from the Arthur J. Schmitt Foundation for his final year of graduate school.

Career 
Delahunty was a guest worker at the National Institute of Diabetes and Digestive and Kidney Diseases in the diabetes branch. At Johns Hopkins School of Medicine, he worked as a visiting associate professor. He later trained in metabolomics at the University of California, Davis.

He joined the faculty at Goucher College in 1979 as a professor of biology. His research focused on metabolism and endocrine control in vertebrates. In 1996, Delahunty was the principal investigator of a $17,249 grant from the National Science Foundation to facilitate computerized data acquisition to conduct physiology research using an experimental approach. He was a co-founder of the postbaccalaureate premedical program at Goucher College. He was the Goucher representative of the Master's of Public Health transfer program between Goucher College and the University of Maryland School of Medicine. In May 2018, Delahunty retired from Goucher.

Delahunty is a member of the American Society of Zoologists, American Association for the Advancement of Science, and the Endocrine Society.

Personal life 
Delahunty met his second wife Katherine Henneberger, an economics professor while they both were teaching at Goucher College. They married circa 1990. Delahunty resides in Owings Mills, Maryland. Henneberger died in September 2006 due to lung cancer.

References

1952 births
20th-century American scientists
21st-century American scientists
Academics from Maryland
Academics from Pennsylvania
American endocrinologists
American physiologists
Duquesne University alumni
Goucher College faculty and staff
Johns Hopkins University faculty
Living people
Marquette University alumni
National Institutes of Health people
People from Owings Mills, Maryland
People from Upper Darby Township, Pennsylvania
University of California, Davis faculty